The First Anglo-Maratha War (1775–1782) was the first of three Anglo-Maratha Wars fought between the British East India Company and Maratha Empire in India. The war began with the Treaty of Surat and ended with the Treaty of Salbai. The war was fought in between Surat and Pune Kingdom saw British defeat and restoration of positions of both the parties before the war. Warren Hastings, the first President and Governor-General of East India Company's provinces in India decided not to attack Poona directly.

Background
After the death of Madhavrao Peshwa in 1772, his brother Narayanrao became peshwa (prime minister) of the Maratha Empire.  Narayanrao was murdered by his palace guards in August 1773, and his uncle Raghunathrao (Raghoba) became Peshwa. However, Narayanrao's wife, Gangabai, gave birth to a posthumous son, who was the legal heir to the throne. The newborn infant was named 'Sawai' Madhavrao (Sawai means "One and a Quarter"). Twelve Maratha chiefs, known as the Baarbhai  and led by Nana Phadnavis, directed an effort to install the infant as the new Peshwa and to rule in his name as regents.

Raghunathrao, unwilling to give up his position of power, sought help from the British at Bombay and signed the Treaty of Surat on 6 March 1775. According to the treaty, Raghunathrao ceded the territories of Salsette and Bassein (Vasai) to the British, along with part of the revenues from Surat and Bharuch districts. In return, the British promised to provide Raghunathrao with 2,500 soldiers.

The British Calcutta Council condemned the Treaty of Surat, sending Colonel Upton to Pune to annul it and make a new treaty with the regency. The Treaty of Purandhar (1 March 1776) annulled that of Surat, Raghunathrao was pensioned and his cause abandoned, but the revenues of Salsette and Broach districts were retained by the British. The Bombay government rejected this new treaty and gave refuge to Raghunathrao. In 1777, Nana Phadnavis violated his treaty with the Calcutta Council by granting the French a port on the West coast. The English retaliated by sending a force towards Pune.

Initial stage and Treaty of Purandar (1775–1776)
British troops under the command of Colonel Keating, left Surat on 15 March 1775, for Pune.  But they were checked by Haripant Phadke at Adas and were totally defeated on 18 May 1775. Casualties for Keating's force, accompanied by Raghunathrao, included 96 killed. The Marathas casualties in the Battle of Adas (Gujarat) included 150 killed.

Warren Hastings estimated that direct actions against Pune would be detrimental. Therefore, the Supreme Council of Bengal condemned the Treaty of Surat, sending Colonel Upton to Pune to annul it and make a new treaty with the regency. An agreement between Upton and the ministers of Pune called Treaty of Purandar was signed on 1 March 1776.

The Treaty of Purandhar (1 March 1776) annulled that of Surat, Raghunath Rao was pensioned and his cause abandoned, but the revenues of Salsette and Broach districts were retained by the British.

Battle of Wadgaon

Following a treaty between France and the Poona Government in 1776, the Bombay Government decided to invade and reinstate Raghoba.  They sent a force under Col. Egerton reached Khopoli and made its way through the Western Ghats at Bhor Ghat and onwards toward Karla, which was reached on 4 January 1779 while under Maratha attacks. Finally the British were forced to retreat back to Wadgaon, but were soon surrounded.  The British surrendered and were forced to sign the Treaty of Wadgaon on 16 January 1779, a victory for the Marathas.

Reinforcements from northern India, commanded by Colonel (later General) Thomas Wyndham Goddard, arrived too late to save the Bombay force. The British Governor-General in Bengal, Warren Hastings, rejected the treaty on the grounds that the Bombay officials had no legal power to sign it, and ordered Goddard to secure British interests in the area.

Goddard with 6,000 troops stormed Bhadra Fort and captured Ahmedabad on 15 February 1779. There was a garrison of 6,000 Arab and Sindhi infantry and 2,000 horses. Losses in the fight totalled 108, including two British. Goddard also captured Bassein on 11 December 1780. Another Bengal detachment led by Captain Popham and assisted by the Rana of Gohad, captured Gwalior on 4 August 1780, before Mahadji Scindia could make preparations. Skirmishes took place between Mahadji Scindia and General Goddard in Gujarat, but indecisively. Hastings sent yet another force to harass Mahadji Shinde, commanded by Major Camac.

Central India and the Deccan 

After capturing Bassein, Goddard marched towards Pune. But he was routed in the Battle of Bhor Ghat in April 1781 by Parshurambha, Haripant Phadke and Tukoji Holkar.

In central India, Mahadji stationed himself at Malwa to challenge Camac. Initially, Mahadji had an upper hand and British forces under Camac, being harassed and reduced, had to retreat to Hadur.

In February 1781 the British beat Shinde to the town of Sipri, but every move they made after that was shadowed by his much larger army, and their supplies were cut off, until they made a desperate night raid in late March, capturing not only supplies, but even guns and elephants. Thereafter, the military threat from Shinde's forces to the British was much reduced.

The contest was equally balanced now. Where Mahadji scored a significant victory over Camac at Sironj, the British avenged the loss through the Battle of Durdah on 24 March 1781.

Colonel Murre arrived with fresh forces in April 1781 to assist Popham and Camac. After his defeat at Sipri, Mahadji Shinde got alarmed.  Therefore, Shinde proposed a new treaty
between the Peshwas and the British which came to be known as “Treaty of Salbai”.

Treaty of Salbai

This treaty, known as the Treaty of Salbai, was signed on 17 May 1782, and was ratified by Hastings in June 1782 and by Nana Phadnavis in February 1783. The treaty ended the First Anglo-Maratha War, restored the status quo, and established peace between the two parties for 20 years.

In popular culture

The 2013 Hollywood film titled The Lovers is based on the backdrop of this war.

See also

 Second Anglo-Maratha War
 Third Anglo-Maratha War
 List of Maratha dynasties and states
 James Hartley (Indian officer)

Notes

Further reading
 Beck, Sanderson. India & Southeast Asia to 1800 (2006)   "Marathas and the English Company 1701–1818" online. Retrieved 1 October 2004.
 Gordon, Stewart. Marathas, marauders, and state formation in eighteenth-century India (Oxford University Press, 1994).
 Gordon, Stewart. "The Marathas," in  New Cambridge History of India, II.4, (Cambridge U Press, 1993).
 Seshan, Radhika. "The Maratha State: Some Preliminary Considerations." Indian Historical Review 41.1 (2014): 35–46.  online

External links
 Athale, Anil. Anil Athale on Joffe's Invaders. Retrieved 21 July 2011.
 Hameed, Shahul. The First Anglo-Maratha War (1775–1782). Retrieved 1 October 2004.
 Indian History – British Period. Retrieved 1 October 2004.
 Paranjpe, Amit et al. History of Maharashtra . Retrieved 1 October 2004.
 https://sites.google.com/vvdatalink.com/vv-datalink/knowledge/history/indian-history/mordern-history/anglo-maratha-wars

Ang
Anglo-Maratha War 1
Anglo-Maratha War 1
Anglo-Maratha War 1
1775 in India
1775 in the British Empire
1776 in India
1777 in India
1778 in India
1779 in India
1780 in India
1781 in India
1782 in India
1782 in the British Empire
Conflicts in 1775
Conflicts in 1776
Conflicts in 1777
Conflicts in 1778
Conflicts in 1779
Conflicts in 1780
Conflicts in 1781
Conflicts in 1782
Military history of British India